Son frère (English: His Brother) is a novel by Philippe Besson. It was published by Julliard in Paris in 2001. It was later published as a softcover issue.

In 2003, Patrice Chéreau adapted the text for a feature film Son frère also known by its English title His Brother.

2001 novels
French-language novels
French novels adapted into films